Metacrias is a genus of moths in the family Erebidae. All species are endemic to New Zealand.

Taxonomy 
Metacrias was first described by Edward Meyrick in a paper in the journal Proceedings of the Linnean Society of New South Wales published in 1887. It has been postulated that this genus may be cogeneric with Phaos, an Australian genus.

Species
Metacrias erichrysa Meyrick, 1886
Metacrias huttoni Butler, 1879
Metacrias strategica (Hudson, 1889)

References

Spilosomina
Moth genera
Moths of New Zealand
Endemic fauna of New Zealand
Endemic moths of New Zealand